Peter Meyer (born 18 February 1940, in Düsseldorf) is a retired German football player. He spent four seasons in the Bundesliga with Fortuna Düsseldorf and Borussia Mönchengladbach. He also represented Germany once, in a UEFA Euro 1968 qualifier against Albania.

Career

Fortuna Düsseldorf
Meyer started his career at Wersten 04 and TuRU Düsseldorf before joining Fortuna Düsseldorf in 1960. He played in the 1961–62 DFB-Pokal final with the club, losing 2–1 to 1. FC Nürnberg. In 1966, he helped Fortuna reach the Bundesliga for the first time, scoring twice in a 5–1 victory against Kickers Offenbach in the Aufstiegsrunde, securing the club's promotion on goal average. He appeared 25 times and scored eight goals during the following season in the Bundesliga, but could not prevent Fortuna from being relegated at the end of the campaign. Meyer was not offered a new contract following Fortuna's relegation, and was free to look for a new club. With a total of 119 goals in 174 league games between 1960 and 1967, he is the club's record goalscorer.

Borussia Mönchengladbach
After initially agreeing terms with MSV Duisburg, Meyer opted to sign for Borussia Mönchengladbach after being persuaded to join the club by Günter Netzer, who showed up at the car workshop that Meyer worked at. He debuted on 19 August 1967 against Schalke 04, scoring a hat trick in a 4–3 away win, and went on to score 19 goals for the club in the first half of the 1967–68 Bundesliga season. He was subsequently selected by Helmut Schön to play for West Germany in their decisive Euro 1968 qualification match against Albania in Tirana. West Germany failed to qualify after drawing the match 0–0, and the game became known as the "Disgrace of Tirana".

Injury and retirement
In January 1968, during a training match played in Duisburg, Meyer broke his tibia and fibula following a collision with his own goalkeeper Volker Danner. Meyer never fully recovered from the injury, and required a second operation after returning to training too soon after the incident. He made a brief comeback in August 1969, starting in a league match against Bayern Munich, but was substituted at half-time, and never made another appearance in the Bundesliga. He left the club at the end of the 1969–70 season and dropped into amateur football, joining VfL Benrath in the Verbandsliga Niederrhein, followed by Viktoria 02 before deciding to retire.

Honours
 Bundesliga champion: 1969–70

References

External links
 

1940 births
Living people
Footballers from Düsseldorf
German footballers
Germany international footballers
Fortuna Düsseldorf players
Borussia Mönchengladbach players
Bundesliga players
Association football forwards
West German footballers